Polygala lutea, commonly known as orange- or yellow milkwort, is a plant in the milkwort family (Polygalaceae) native to pine-barren depressions and swamps in coastal areas of the southern and eastern the United States. It was first described in 1753 by Carl Linnaeus.

Description
It flowers between April and October.

References

lutea